The 2022–23 Drexel Dragons women's basketball team will represent Drexel University during the 2022–23 NCAA Division I women's basketball season. The Dragons, led by third-year head coach Amy Mallon, will play their home games at the Daskalakis Athletic Center in Philadelphia, Pennsylvania as members of the Colonial Athletic Association.

On December 18, in a game against Penn State, Keishana Washington set the school record for most points scored in regulation with 42 points.

On January 1, in a game against Towson, Maura Hendrixson set the school record for most assists in a single game with 14 assists.

Previous season

The Dragons finished the 2021–22 season 28–6, 16–2 in CAA play to finish in first place. They lost to Delaware in the CAA tournament championship. As conference regular season champions, the team earned an automatic bid to the 2022 Women's National Invitation Tournament, where they were defeated by Seton Hall in the third round.

Offseason

Departures

Recruiting classes

2022 recruiting class

2023 recruiting class

Preseason 
In a poll of the league coaches at the CAA's media day, Drexel was picked to finish in first place in the CAA. Keishana Washington was named to the Preseason All-CAA First Team, and also selected as the Preseason CAA Player of the Year.

Roster

Schedule and results

|-
!colspan=12 style=| Non-conference regular season
|-

|-
!colspan=12 style=| CAA regular season
|-

|-
!colspan=12 style=| CAA Tournament

|-
!colspan=12 style=| WNIT

Awards
Kylie Lavelle
CAA All-Rookie Team
CAA Rookie of the Week (4)

Grace O’Neill
CAA All-Rookie Team
CAA Rookie of the Week (2)

Keishana Washington
CAA Player of the Year
CAA All-Conference First Team
Becky Hammon Mid-Major Player of the Year Award Semifinalist
USBWA National Player of the Week
CAA Player of the Week (5)
Preseason CAA Player of the Year
Preseason CAA All-Conference First Team

Rankings

See also
 2022–23 Drexel Dragons men's basketball team

References

Drexel Dragons women's basketball seasons
Drexel
Drexel
Drexel